Negros Trade Fair is the longest running provincial trade fair started in 1985 by the Manila-based Negrenses who were moved by the news of poverty among the sugar farm workers in Negros Island. The First Negros Trade Fair was organized at the Makati Carpark at the behest of Bea Zobel from Ayala Land, Inc. with goods coming from backyard industries of Negros. Daniel "Bitay" Lacson, Jr., then Negros Navigation President and CEO, shipped the goods from Bacolod to Manila for free. The movement later grew as Bitay Lacson was appointed as OIC Governor of Negros Occidental and was re-elected into office.

This annual trade fair became a precursor for a vision to organize a formal association to consolidate the then fledgling individual producers. The Association of Negros Producers (ANP) was formed and registered in 1988 with the Securities and Exchange Commission, incorporated by the so-called "14+1" from the fourteen housewives and one gentleman who became incorporators of ANP. From then on, the task of organizing the annual Negros Trade Fair was passed on to the newly formed association.

Exhibition Categories 
The producer exhibitors from the Association of Negros Producers (ANP) are divided among the following:

 Food
 Gifts and Housewares
 Fashion
 Natural and Organic
 Furniture and Furnishing
 Tourism

Trade Fairs

2012

This year's theme for the trade fair, the 27th Negros Trade Fair, is Beyond Limits. The trade fair will run from September 26 to 30, 2012 at Rockwell Tent.

2011

In 2011 the Negros Trade Fair was held in Rockwell Tent Makati with the theme: . On the same year, the Association of Negros Producers launched its new line of products, the Natural and Organic.

2010

This was the Silver Anniversary of the Negros Trade Fair. ANP launched the coffee table book "Silver Tiangge" detailing the history of food and culture in Negros Island.

1987

The 1987 theme for Third Negros Trade Fair was Masskara sa Makati with Masskara dancers sent to Manila to perform dances. Nikko Garden Hotel in Makati provided the space for the trade fair with the support of the Department of Trade and Industry.

Bulawan Awards

Bulawan Awards was formed in 1990 by former ANP Vice-President Lyn Gamboa that awarded the producers for new products that they are launching at the Negros Trade Fair. The awardees are as follows:

1995
Hacienda Crafts

1996
Reeds and Weeds

1997
Woven Fancies
Johanna's Export

1998
Barriolass
Golden Furnishing

1999
Art Energy

2000
Barriolass
SDT Handicrafts

2001
Woven Fancies
Art Energy

2002
VS Heirlooms
Johanna's Export

2003
Art Energy
Nonoy's Art Craft

2004
Babylan's Cococrafts
Hacienda Crafts

2005

2006
Barriolass
Golden Furnishing

2007
Reeds and Weeds

2008
Reeds and Weeds
Atelier Aguila

2009
Art Energy

2010
Atelier Aguila
Vito Prints

2011

2012

Accessibility 
The venue of the Negros Trade Fair for a decade consistently is the Rockwell Tent in Rockwell Center, Makati. Rockwell Tent is accessible through public transport via jeepneys plying the route of Guadalupe-Ayala. Taxis are available as well in the area 24/7 though the operating hours of the trade fair are from 8am to 9pm.

References

External links 
Association of Negros Producers
Negros Trade Fair

Trade fairs in the Philippines
Events in Metro Manila